Jerry Hopkins may refer to:

 Jerry Hopkins (author) (1935–2018), American author and journalist
 Jerry Hopkins (American football) (born 1941), former professional American football player